Mansfield Legacy High School is a public secondary school located in Mansfield, Texas, United States.

The school is a part of the Mansfield Independent School District and serves sections of the city of Mansfield, Arlington, as well as unincorporated sections of Tarrant County. Legacy is built on the location of the men’s club. When Mansfield was a small rural community (in the southeast of Ft. Worth), the Kowbell Rodeo was a popular stopping place for cowboys. The land on former US Highway 287, now Business 287, was the place to go for an indoor rodeo experience.

History
William H. (Bill) Hogg, a lifetime resident of Mansfield, opened the Kowbell Indoor Rodeo in 1959. Rodeos were held each Saturday night, year around. The Arena was built originally with an open roof and a canvas top that could be lowered for shelter during inclement weather.

The Kowbell Rodeo closed, and the property was sold to MISD in 2004. Because of Mansfield's fast population growth, MISD administrators purchased the historic location to build the district's fourth high school. After clearing land and deciding on blueprints, newly hired principal, David Wright, formed a committee to create the school's name and mascot. Legacy fit perfectly. Broncos fit even better. In June 2006, committee members chose red and black as the colors. Legacy High School was turned over to MISD in June 2007 by the builder and school opened, with over 2,100 students, on August 27, 2007.

Feeder patterns 
The following elementary schools feed into Mansfield Legacy High School:

 Holt (partial)
 Nash (partial)
 Neal
 Norwood (partial)
 Perry (partial)
 Ponder
 Sheppard
 Tarver-Rendon

The following intermediate schools feed into Mansfield Legacy High School:

 Cross Timbers (partial)
 Martinez (partial)
 Orr (partial)
 Shepard (partial)

The following middle schools feed into Mansfield Legacy High School:

 Howard (partial)
 Jobe (partial)
 McKinzey (partial)
 Worley (partial)

Notable alumni 
Noah Syndergaard, 2010, MLB pitcher for the New York Mets
Tejay Antone, 2012, MLB pitcher for the Cincinnati Reds
Josh Doctson, 2011, American football wide receiver for the Washington Redskins
Tevin Mitchel, 2011, American football cornerback for the Indianapolis Colts
Rees Odhiambo, 2011, American football offensive lineman for the Seattle Seahawks
Ryan Kirby, Vocalist of Fit For A King

References

External links 
 Mansfield Legacy High School
 Legacy's Student Newspaper

Public high schools in Tarrant County, Texas
Mansfield Independent School District high schools
Mansfield, Texas
2007 establishments in Texas
Educational institutions established in 2007